Sam Gleadle (born 20 March 1996) is an English professional footballer who plays as a winger for USL Championship side Monterey Bay.

Early and personal life
Born in Chichester, England, Gleadle moved to the United States at the age of nine due to his father's job.

Career
After playing at youth level for Scottsdale 96 Blackhawks and Real Salt Lake, and college soccer with the New Mexico Lobos, Gleadle began his senior career in 2017 with Albuquerque Sol.

Reno 1868
Gleadle began his professional career in 2018 with Reno 1868. Gleadle was released by Reno at the end of the 2018 season, having made 1 appearance for the club. However, on 6 February 2019, Gleadle rejoined Reno for the 2019 season, making his USL Championship debut the following month in a 2–2 draw with Orange County.

Minnesota United
On 30 October 2020, following the USL Championship regular season, Gleadle joined MLS side Minnesota United ahead of their upcoming play-off fixtures. He was released by Minnesota on 11 March 2021, ahead of their 2021 season.

San Antonio FC
Gleadle signed with USL Championship side San Antonio FC on 6 April 2021.

Monterey Bay FC
Gleadle signed with USL Championship side Monterey Bay on 23 February 2022, ahead of their inaugural season. Gleadle was included in the starting 11 for Monterey Bay's inaugural match, a 4-2 loss to Phoenix Rising FC. Gleadle scored his first goal for Monterey Bay on 21 May 2022, during a 2-0 victory over Louisville City FC. Gleadle finished the season with eight goals, his highest total in a single season in his career. He shared Monterey Bay's 2022 Golden Boot award with teammate Chase Boone who also finished the season with eight goals. Gleadle was also named the season's Most Valuable Player, as voted by his teammates. 

Prior to the 2023 USL Championship season, Gleadle signed a multi-year contract with Monterey Bay FC that would see him stay at the club through at least the 2024 USL Championship season.

Career statistics

References

1996 births
Living people
English footballers
Sportspeople from Chichester
Association football wingers
Real Salt Lake players
New Mexico Lobos men's soccer players
Albuquerque Sol FC players
Reno 1868 FC players
Minnesota United FC players
San Antonio FC players
Monterey Bay FC players
USL Championship players
USL League Two players
English expatriate footballers
Expatriate soccer players in the United States
English expatriate sportspeople in the United States